Strzelecki National Park is a national park on Flinders Island, Tasmania (Australia), 307 km north of Hobart. The park is home to abundant wildlife including more than one hundred bird species, wombats, and potoroos. It is named after Sir Paul Edmund Strzelecki, a famous Polish explorer and geologist who made a lot of his explorations on the Australian continent and was proclaimed in 1967.

It covers a SW corner of the island including Mount Strzelecki (756m), a Devonian granite twin peak mountain.  It was the first peak climbed in the Three Peaks Race.

See also
 Protected areas of Tasmania (Australia)

References

National parks of Tasmania
1967 establishments in Australia
Flinders Island